LUMBA is the popular acronym for MBA programme of Department of Business Administration, University of Lucknow. The department is one of the oldest institutions in field of Business Administration in India. Established in 1956 the course was run as Master of Commerce in Business Administration under the aegis of Department of Business Administration, Faculty of Commerce, University of Lucknow. Later on in 1976 it was named Masters in Business Administration. The admission for the post graduate programme is done through Common Admission Test (CAT). The Department also has the Doctoral Program which takes admission through written entrance examination and preferably University Grants CommissionJunior Research Fellowship qualified candidates.

Mission
To be a leading institution on the field of management education and research engaged in providing contemporary management knowledge, development of business skills and inculcating professional attitudes among motivated individuals for preparing them to assume positions of responsibility and leadership in the fields of management endeavor.

Recently a workshop was held on Responsible Management Education in association with Principles for Responsible Management Education (PRME) Secretariat, United Nations Global Compact Office. Mr. Jonas Haertle, Head, of the (PRME) Secretariat was the key speaker at the workshop including other dignitaries from academics.

Alumni
With more than 2000 graduates from the Institution the alumni have made their presence felt in the Global and Indian corporate world. Several alumni hold top rank position in the Indian Corporate sector and many have plunged into entrepreneurship.

Mr Arvind Saxena Managing Director, Volkswagen India 
Mr Kapil Bali, CEO Reliance Spot Exchange
Anupam Jalote, Entrepreneur
Animesh Sharma, Entrepreneur

References

University of Lucknow